Laemophloeus megacephalus is a species of lined flat bark beetle in the family Laemophloeidae. It is found in the Caribbean Sea, Central America, and North America.

References

Further reading

 
 
 

Laemophloeidae
Articles created by Qbugbot
Beetles described in 1876